Frank Kramer (27 November 1947 – 1 December 2020) was a Dutch footballer who played as a striker, TV presenter and football commentator.

Club career
Born in Amsterdam as the youngest in a family of seven children, the curly-haired Kramer played for hometown side Blauw Wit and moved to the newly-formed FC Amsterdam in 1972. In the 1973/74 season he was sent on loan to MVV but did not want to return to FC Amsterdam after a feud with manager Pim van de Meent. In 1975 he joined Telstar and then FC Volendam. He made his debut for Volendam on 14 August 1977 against AZ'67 and scored 27 goals in 98 league matches in two spells for them. He went on to play for Haarlem and Telstar again before finishing his career at Volendam.

Kramer scored 23 goals in 126 Eredivisie matches. A colourful figure, Kramer once showed the Ajax supporters his bare buttocks after being constantly mocked by them.

Television
During his playing career, he also worked as a flight attendant for Lufthansa and was a German language teacher. In 1977 he started a television career which took him from presenting AVRO's Sportpanorama and Sterrenslag to De Frank Kramer Show, Hints and Boggle. He worked as a commentator for Eurosport from 1994 through 2018, reporting on the Africa Nations Cup and Major League Soccer matches among others.

Personal life
He lost his sister and his girlfriend at a young age. In the 1970s, Kramer was in a relationship with musician Judy Schomper. From 1997 he was with his wife Mira de Vries.

Kramer got ill on his 73rd birthday and fell in a coma. He died four days later.

References

1947 births
2020 deaths
Footballers from Amsterdam
Association football wingers
Dutch footballers
Blauw-Wit Amsterdam players
FC Amsterdam players
MVV Maastricht players
SC Telstar players
FC Volendam players
HFC Haarlem players
Eredivisie players
Eerste Divisie players
Dutch game show hosts
Dutch association football commentators